Isaac David Abella (June 20, 1934 – October 23, 2016) was a Canadian physicist who was a professor at the University of Chicago. He specialized in laser physics, quantum optics, and spectroscopy. Isaac was the cousin of Irving Abella.

Early life and education
Isaac Abella was born on June 20, 1934 in Toronto, Ontario, Canada. Abella received his Bachelor of Arts degree (1957) from the University of Toronto, Master of Arts (1959) degree, and Ph.D. (1963) in Physics from Columbia University in New York. He studied under Charles H. Townes  and was involved in the early research work of laser development. Notably, Abella's thesis under Townes was among the earliest work on two-photon absorption.

Career
Abella was known for his work with laser coherent transients, where photon echo techniques are used to probe metastable excited states in rare gas mixtures such as helium, neon, and argon. These states are produced in a weakly ionized RF plasma discharge, and nitrogen-pumped dye lasers are used to generate the coherent super-position states. The University of Chicago.

He was also known for his work in spectroscopy of rare-earth laser materials. Samples of YLF and YAG crystals doped with erbium, thulium, and holmium are being studied with selective laser excitation in the region of 780 nm, the erbium bands. These materials can be efficiently optically pumped by the AlGaAs-GaAs laser diode arrays, but dye laser excitation is used instead. He was interested in the energy transfer process: Er to Tm, to Ho, which concentrates energy emission at 2.085 µm at room temperature and at liquid nitrogen. The process is a radiationless, almost resonant transfer of energy between sites and depends on the relative concentrations of the rare earth ions. In particular his experimental interests are measuring decay rates, excited state absorption, and branching ratios and detailed theories of such processes.

Personal life and death
Isaac Abella died on October 23, 2016 in Chicago, Illinois, at the age of 82.
He was married to Mary Ann Abella, Professor of Art, Chicago State University. He has a son Benjamin, and daughter, Sarah.

Articles 

A. E, Siegman, Lasers, University Science Press, Sausalito  CA, 1986
Charles Townes. "How the Laser Happened", Oxford University Press, 1999
J. Hecht, "The Race to Make the First Laser", Oxford University Press, 2005

References

External links 

 Oral history for Isaac Abella (22 October 1985), American Institute of Physics

1934 births
2016 deaths
Jewish Canadian scientists
Columbia Graduate School of Arts and Sciences alumni
Laser researchers
Scientists from Toronto
University of Toronto alumni
University of Chicago faculty
Canadian expatriate academics in the United States
20th-century Canadian  physicists
21st-century Canadian physicists
Jewish physicists
Rare earth scientists